The Social Democratic Workers' Party of Romania (PSDMR), established in 1893, was the first modern socialist political party in Romania. A Marxist organization, the PSDMR was part of the Second International and sent its representatives to the first five congresses of that organization. Never a strong organization, the RSDWP was further weakened following an organizational split in February 1900, only reviving after 1905. In February 1910 the PSDMR was absorbed into a new organization, the Romanian Social Democratic Party (PSDR), effectively ending its existence in its original incarnation.

Organizational history

Background

The history of socialism in Romania begins in 1834, when an aristocrat named Teodor Diamant (1810-1841) established a utopian socialist colony based on the ideas of French writer Charles Fourier in the town of Scăieni, located north of Bucharest. This experiment in agricultural communitarianism was terminated in 1836.

During the decade of the 1870s, socialist ideas again began to gain attention in Romania, particularly among certain university students in Bucharest. Constantin Dobrogeanu-Gherea (1855-1920) is the best remembered among these early advocates of Marxist ideas in Romania.

Establishment

In 1893 the PSDMR was established in an effort to unite various radical individuals in a unitary political organization.

The PSDMR was particularly strong in the city of Bucharest and it grew to about 6,000 members by 1897.

Split

In February 1900 the PSDMR split between a reformist wing that sought to unite all pro-democracy forces, socialist and non-socialist, in a single political party and a radical wing that sought to continue the political fight not just for political democracy but also for the cause of socialist economy. The reform wing was absorbed into the ranks of the National Liberal Party and continued their political efforts in that organization.

After about five years of a weak underground existence, the radical wing of the PSDMR reemerged as the Socialist Union of Romania (Uniunea Socialistă din România), working closely with the emerging trade union movement in Bucharest.

New organization

In February 1910 the Socialist Union of Romania determined to establish a new national political organization known as the  Romanian Social Democratic Party (PSDR) and dissolved itself to join the ranks of that new organization.

Footnotes

1893 establishments in Romania
1910 disestablishments in Romania
Defunct socialist parties in Romania
Marxist parties
Political parties disestablished in 1910
Political parties established in 1893